James Hunter may refer to:

Entertainment
 James Hunter (military artist) (1755–1792), military artist in British India
 James H. Hunter (1890–1982), Scottish-born Canadian Christian mystery writer
 James Hunter (singer) (born 1962), English R&B singer
 Jamie Hunter (River City), a fictional character on River City
 Jim Hunter, fictional character on Scottish soap opera Take the High Road

Law and politics
 James Hill Hunter (1839–1891), Ontario politician
 James Hunter (politician) (1882–1968), Australian politician
 James Hunter III (1916–1989), American judge, Third Circuit Court of Appeals

Sports
 Jimmy Hunter (1879–1962), New Zealand rugby union footballer
 Catfish Hunter (James Augustus Hunter, 1946–1999), American baseball pitcher, 1960s–'70s
 Jim Hunter (skier) (born 1953), Canadian alpine ski racer
 James Hunter (American football) (1954–2010), American football defensive back
 Jim Hunter (baseball) (born 1964), American baseball pitcher, 1990s
 James Hunter (basketball) (born 1991), Australian basketball player
 James Hunter (cricketer) (born 2002), Irish cricketer
 James Hunter (footballer, born 1898) (1898–1982), Scottish footballer (Falkirk, Newcastle, New Bedford)
 James Hunter (rower) (born 1992), New Zealand rower
 Jim Hunter (boxer), British boxer
 Jimmy Hunter (New Zealand footballer), New Zealand international football player

Other
 James William Hunter (1783–1844), Scottish inventor
 James Hunter (minister) (1863–1942), co-founder of the Evangelical Presbyterian Church
 James Hunter, one of the Perth Martyrs
 James Hunter (historian) (born 1948), British historian
 James Davison Hunter (born 1955), professor of sociology at the University of Virginia
 James P. Hunter (1985–2010), Army journalist killed in the War in Afghanistan
 Jim Hunter (sportscaster), American sports journalist, CBS Radio